Gerhard Kaufhold (2 December 1928 – 4 October 2009) was a German footballer who spent his entire career at Kickers Offenbach. He played a total of 396 games in the Oberliga Süd for the club, scoring 112 goals. He also represented West Germany in a 3–1 defeat against England in 1954.

References

External links 
 

1928 births
2009 deaths
Sportspeople from Offenbach am Main
German footballers
Germany international footballers
Association football midfielders
Kickers Offenbach players
Footballers from Hesse